Hackelochloa granularis, the pitscale grass, is a species of grass native to  sub-Saharan Africa and temperate and tropical regions of Asia. It is naturalised to the Southern United States, Mexico and South America.

Characteristics
Hackelochloa granularis is an annual plant. The stems grow to 5–100 cm in length and have bearded nodes. The leaf sheaths are loose with hairs growing from tubercles. The leaves are 2–5 cm in length and 4–12 mm wide with hairs on the surface and ciliate around the edges. The leaves range from straight to lance shaped.

References

Andropogoneae
Grasses of Africa
Grasses of Asia
Flora of temperate Asia
Flora of tropical Asia